The qualifying rounds for the 2005–06 UEFA Champions League began on 12 July 2005. In total, there were three qualifying rounds which provided 16 clubs to join the group stage.

Teams

First qualifying round
The draw for this round was performed on 24 June 2005 in Nyon, Switzerland.

Seeding

Summary
Title-holders Liverpool, as well as 23 league champions from countries ranked 27 or lower on the 2004 UEFA ranking, were drawn against each other and played two matches, home and away, with the winners advancing to the second qualifying round. Though they finished fifth in the Premier League in 2004–05 (at the time, only four teams from an association were allowed to compete in the Champions League), Liverpool was granted a special exemption by UEFA as the holders, whereby they were placed into the first qualification round.

|}

Matches

Dinamo Tbilisi won 2–1 on aggregate.

Artmedia won 4–3 on aggregate.

Neftchi Baku won 4–1 on aggregate.

Rabotnički won 6–1 on aggregate.

Anorthosis won 2–1 on aggregate.

Sheriff Tiraspol won 6–1 on aggregate.

FBK Kaunas won 8–2 on aggregate.

Liverpool won 6–0 on aggregate.

Haka won 3–2 on aggregate.

KF Tirana won 3–2 on aggregate.

Shelbourne won 6–2 on aggregate.

F91 Dudelange won 4–1 on aggregate.

Second qualifying round
The draw for this round was performed on 24 June 2005 in Nyon, Switzerland.

Seeding

Notes

Summary
The 12 winners from the first qualifying round, 10 champions from countries ranked 17–26, and six second–placed teams from countries ranked 10–15 were drawn against each other and played two matches, home and away, with the winners advancing to the third qualifying round.

|}

Matches

Liverpool won 5–1 on aggregate.

Brøndby won 5–1 on aggregate.

Anderlecht won 5–1 on aggregate.

Vålerenga IF won 5–1 on aggregate.

Thun won 3–2 on aggregate.

Anorthosis won 3–2 on aggregate.

Artmedia won 5–4 on aggregate.

CSKA Sofia won 4–0 on aggregate.

Malmö FF won 5–4 on aggregate.

Steaua București won 4–1 on aggregate.

Lokomotiv Moscow won 3–1 on aggregate.

Rapid Wien won 9–3 on aggregate.

Partizan won 2–0 on aggregate.

Debrecen won 8–0 on aggregate.

Third qualifying round
The draw for this round was performed on 29 July 2005 in Nyon, Switzerland.

Seeding

Notes

Summary
The 14 winners from the second qualifying round, six champions from countries ranked 11–16, three second–placed teams from countries ranked 7–9, six third–placed teams from countries ranked 1–6, and three fourth–placed teams from countries ranked 1–3 were drawn to play 2 matches, home and away, with the winners advancing to the group stage and losers advancing to the first round of the UEFA Cup.

|}

Matches

Panathinaikos won 5–4 on aggregate.

Real Betis won 3–2 on aggregate.

1–1 on aggregate; Club Brugge won on penalties.

Manchester United won 6–0 on aggregate.

Villarreal won 4–2 on aggregate.

Rangers won 4–1 on aggregate.

Rosenborg won 4–3 on aggregate.

Rapid Wien won 2–1 on aggregate.

0–0 on aggregate; Artmedia won on penalties.

Liverpool won 3–2 on aggregate.

Udinese won 4–2 on aggregate.

Thun won 4–0 on aggregate.

Internazionale won 3–1 on aggregate.

Werder Bremen won 4–2 on aggregate.

Ajax won 5–3 on aggregate.

Anderlecht won 4–1 on aggregate.

Notes

References

Qualifying Rounds
2005-06